Rimington is a civil parish in Ribble Valley, Lancashire, England.  It contains twelve listed buildings that are recorded in the National Heritage List for England.  All of the listed buildings are designated at Grade II, the lowest of the three grades, which is applied to "buildings of national importance and special interest".  The parish contains the village of Rimington, and other small settlements, and is otherwise rural.  Almost all the listed buildings are house, farmhouses and farm buildings, the others being three milestones, and a chapel with an attached manse.

Buildings

References

Citations

Sources

Lists of listed buildings in Lancashire
Buildings and structures in Ribble Valley